The area known as Colleparco is one of the most recently developed neighborhoods located in the city of Teramo, central Italy.  It is a hilly residential setting resting at an elevation of approximately 300 m.

Overview
The first urbanization of this pleasant area very near the Teramo city center dates back to the 1980s when a number of large cooperative apartment buildings were conceptualized, granted the necessary planning permits, and eventually constructed.  To this day these large structures dominant the surrounding landscape.

In the 1990s the University of Teramo Schools of Law, Political Science, and Communications also built large classroom and faculty buildings in Colleparco. These building have become a focal point of the university in whose classrooms are heard the most illustrious and learned scholars from not only the Abruzzo Region and Italy but also from other EU countries and foreign lands.  Many of the commercial establishments in Colleparco are oriented to providing services to the university and the scholars who work therein.

Thanks in large part to the work of Don Giovanni Bruni, the local priest of San Gabriele dell'Addolorata (Saint Gabriel of the Sorrows) parrish, Colleparco also boasts a church-sponsored conference hall which serves as a meeting center for both religious functions as well as civic events important to the citizens of the neighborhood. Another local church, Sala del Regno serves the members of the Jehovah's Witnesses

See also
Teramo
Cona
Gammarana
Piano della Lenta

Neighborhoods of Teramo